New Zealand competed at the 2022 World Games held in Birmingham, United States from 7 to 17 July 2022. Athletes representing New Zealand won one gold medal, one silver medal and one bronze medal. The country finished in 40th place in the medal table.

Medalists

Competitors
The following is the list of number of competitors in the Games.

Air sports

New Zealand competed in air sports.

Archery

New Zealand competed in archery.

Beach handball

New Zealand competed in beach handball.

Canoe polo

New Zealand won the bronze medal in the women's canoe polo tournament.

Cue sports

New Zealand competed in cue sports.

Fistball

New Zealand competed in fistball.

Karate

New Zealand competed in karate.

Orienteering

New Zealand won one gold medal in orienteering.

Trampoline gymnastics

New Zealand won one silver medal in trampoline gymnastics.

Water skiing

New Zealand competed in water skiing.

References

Nations at the 2022 World Games
2022
World Games